Brazil competed at the 2012 Summer Paralympics in London, United Kingdom, from 29 August to 9 September 2012. Brazil was the next host of the Summer Paralympics, holding the 2016 Games in Rio de Janeiro.
A Brazilian segment was performed in Closing Ceremony.

Medalists

Athletics

Men

Track events

Field events

Women

Track events

Boccia

Individual matches

Pairs and team events

Cycling

Men's track

Men's track

Equestrian

Individual events

Team

Football 5-a-side

Brazil has qualified for the football 5-a-side tournament.

Group play

Semi-final

Gold medal match

Rank:

Football 7-a-side

Brazil has qualified for the football 7-a-side tournament.

Group play

Semi-final

Bronze medal match

Goalball

Men's tournament

Group play

Quarter-final

Semi-final

Gold medal match

Rank:

Women's tournament

Group play

Quarter-final

Judo

Men

Women

Powerlifting

Men

Women

Rowing

Men

Sailing

Shooting

Swimming

Men

Women

Table tennis

Men

Women

Teams

Volleyball

Men's tournament

Roster

Group play

Quarter-final

5th–8th place semi-final

5th/6th place match

Women's tournament

Roster

Group play

5th–8th place semi-final

5th/6th place match

Wheelchair basketball

Women's tournament

Group play

9th/10th place match

Wheelchair fencing

Wheelchair tennis

Men

Women

References

Nations at the 2012 Summer Paralympics
2012
Summer Paralympics